Eliphalet Dyer (September 14, 1721 – May 13, 1807) was an American lawyer, jurist, and statesman from Windham, Connecticut. He was a delegate for Connecticut to many sessions of the Continental Congress, where he signed the 1774 Continental Association.

Early life and education 
Dyer was born in Windham and attended Yale where, he graduated in 1740. He read law and was admitted to the bar in 1746.

Career 
After completing his legal education, Dyer became a member of the militia. In 1747, he was elected justice of the peace and a member of the colonial assembly. He was also involved in several of the land development schemes for the Susquehanna and Wyoming Valley areas.

During the French and Indian War, Dyer served as a lieutenant colonel in the militia. He participated in the expedition that captured Crown Point from the French, as a Colonel of the Third Connecticut Provincial Regiment in 1755. In 1758, he led his regiment to Canada in support of Amherst’s and Wolfe’s operations.

In 1763, he visited London as an agent for the Susquehanna Land Company in a failed attempt to gain title for a colonial venture to the Wyoming region. Connecticut sent Dyer to New York City for the Stamp Act Congress. This Congress of protest was an important precursor to the American Revolution. In 1766, he was elected a justice of Connecticut’s superior court. He held that post until 1793, serving as chief justice after 1789.

As the Revolution began, Dyer was named to the state’s Committee of Safety and named a delegate to the Continental Congress in 1774. He served in the Congress during 1774–1775, 1777–1779, and 1782–1783. John Adams, in his diary, characterized Dyer as "...longwinded and roundabout, obscure and cloudy, very talkative and very tedious, yet an honest, worthy man; means and judges well."

Personal life 
Dyer retired from public life in 1793. He died at home in Windham on May 13, 1807, and is buried in the Windham Cemetery. His daughter Amelia was married to Joseph Trumbull, who officially served with Dyer in the Continental Congress but did not attend any sessions.

References

External links

 Dyer's Congressional biography

1721 births
1807 deaths
People from Windham, Connecticut
People of colonial Connecticut
Yale University alumni
Military personnel from Connecticut
Continental Congressmen from Connecticut
Chief Justices of the Connecticut Supreme Court
18th-century American politicians
Members of the Connecticut General Assembly Council of Assistants (1662–1818)
People of Connecticut in the French and Indian War
Speakers of the Connecticut House of Representatives
Burials at Windham Cemetery
Signers of the Continental Association